Club de Deportes Cobreloa S.A.D.P., commonly referred to as Cobreloa, is a Chilean football professional club based in Calama, Región de Antofagasta, Chile. They compete in the Primera B. The club's home ground is the Estadio Zorros del Desierto.

Founded on 7 January 1977, by the initiative of various local groups and the Chilean state-owned enterprise, CODELCO. This club was created starting from the Legal Personality of the local club, Deportes El Loa. On 30 March 2006, the club changed to a Limited sports company with the unanimous approval of 56 of its socios (members). According to the 2018 year public report, the capital of the club is $4.534 billion CLP ($6.697.624,8  USD) spread on 1.000.000 shares of stock without nominal value, mostly owned by the socios (members of club) with 999,999 of them and the chairman of the club with 1 share. In 2018 the first team budget was $100 million CLP.

The club's professional debut in Segunda división professional de Chile was in 1977, achieving the promotion to Primera División in the same year. The club has won the Primera División title in 8 times, and the 1986 Copa Polla Lan Chile. Some of its rivalries are with Club Social y Deportivo Colo-Colo team in the Clásico Albo-Loíno, Club de Deportes Cobresal who dispute the Clasico del Cobre and Deportes Antofagasta in the Clasico de la región de Antofagasta.

In 2019, The Rec.Sport.Soccer Statistics Foundation sorted out in the 71st position in the Worldwide Historical Ranking of Clubs. In CONMEBOL Libertadores Ranking 2021 it is in 68th position.

History
On 1 January 1948, 'Club Social Deportivo Deportes El Loa' was founded in Calama, Chile. This club was the first legal personality    of the team and the first team in Calama in have this type of personality. In 1951, the team played in the association with a second team with the name 'Cóndor'. Later, in February 1955, the team was renamed to 'Club Deportivo y Social Sport Cóndor'.

In 1959, the Amateur team of Calama, trained by Roberto Rodríguez Antequera won the 'National de Fútbol Amateur' in its 28th edition, an amateur championship. The final was against 'Thomas Bata de Peñaflor' disputed in the Estadio Municipal de Calama. Later, in 1961 Chuquicamata Amateur team won the next championship against  Osorno with a score of 3–2 with a hat trick from Mario Valencia, in the Estadio Anaconda of Chuquicamata, with an attendance of 6.346 . These facts pushed to the 'El Loa' citizen the desire to  have a professional team in the city.

In January 1967, the idea of fusing Deportes Cóndor with Santiago Morning was originated using the name of 'Loa Morning' to participate into professional football, the election of that time was the financial crisis of the chosen one team, what led to relegate they to 'Segunda División'; the directors of CODELCO led by Carlos Seguel accepted an approach period with this team, but this idea failed due the negative of the 'socios' and the directive of both teams.

On 2 January 1968, 'Gobernación del Loa' decided to introduce a football club to professional football to represent the northern chile region, to this end, they encouraged Cóndor and 'Correvuela', the team of the neighboring Chuquicamata, but this initiative failed because the 'Asociación Central de Fútbol' decided incorporate 'Antofagasta Portuario' like a representative.
In 1969, the team attempted to join 'Segunda División', registering under the name 'Deportes El Loa' although the legal personality was Sport Cóndor since January 28 of 1970.

The director board of 'Club Regional Antofagasta' held some talks with the regional Mayor of Region of Antofagasta in order to get Codelco workers to join and give one percent of their salary to the club, but the local government officials rejected the idea.

On 26 September 1976, the 'Cámara del Comercio', Railroad Unions, merchants and businessmen, sports directors of the 'El Loa' and also the Coronel Fernando Ibáñez, the prefect Francisco Núñez Venegas and the assistant directors of CODELCO, José Gorrini, Renzo Gasparini, Orlando Urbina and Nicolás Tschischow formed a committee called 'Pro Ingreso al Fútbol Rentado' with the purpose of induction 'Deportes El Loa' to professional football in Chile. The director of the hospital of Roy H. Glover, Sergio Stóppel joined this effort. United under the motto 'Ahora o Núnca', and was subsequently accepted into 'Segunda División' on the 14 October in the same year. In December this initiative counted with the approval of clubs like Regional Antofagasta, Colo-Colo, Naval, Aviación, Huachipato, Coquimbo, Ovalle, Everton, Wanderers and O'higgins.

On 7 January 1977, the NCO School of Carabineros of Chile, all directors of Asociación Central de Fútbol and all representatives of Chilean football clubs were reunited at 18.30 P.M. in Calama and Chuquicamata. Through the local Radio, 'Radio El Loa', at 20.15 P.M. the incorporation of 'Deportes El Loa' to the professional football by unanimous 'Primera and Segunda división' clubs approval was officially announced.

The governor and the mayor of Calama,  called to the citizens to support this new project, end celebrated the event. To celebrate this fact, they chose a new name for the team, rejecting the proposed 'Calama Loa' due to this name not being representative of mining that composes the main economic activity of the region. The team was finally renamed to 'Cobreloa'.

Cobreloa is a relatively new club, having been founded on 7 January 1977. The name Cobreloa comes from combining the Spanish word for copper (cobre), and loa, after the province and the Loa River, the longest river in Chile, which is located near Calama and Chuquicamata, the world's largest open pit copper mining|mine.

Due the inexperience of the directors of the team on professional football, they decided to sign up Alfonso Fuentes who had previously worked as a manager for Lota Schwager. The directors of the team, José Gorrini and Francisco Núñez, decided to incorporate to team as a section of CODELCO.

Fernando Riera, helped by Carlos Lillio Guerrero y Roberto Rodríguez, was asked to select the players for the team. They presented requirements to Executive Committee of the team to create the first squad with selection of the best players in the El Loa región:

The first historical match of the team was on January 12 of this year, against Tocopilla selection team, playing away. The result of the match was victory of the team by 0–1.

The first head coach of the club was elected in a shortlist between Salvador Nocetti, Pedro Morales, Luis Santibañez, Caopolicán Peña, Isaac Carrasco and Andrés Prieto, Been this last option the chosen by the directors, beetween the  signs with the club on 15 January 1977, he choose the transfers of the first team, been the following.

The preseason was in the location of Las Vertientes, a place near to Calama, this helped to conform the first squad who would play the first year league and cup season of the team.

The first official match of the team was on the date February 6 of this year, playing away against 'Regional Antofagasta', on the Estadio 'Regional de Antofagasta' valid for 'Copa Chile', winning by 0–2 with goals of Armando Alarcón on 20' and Juan Rogelio Núñez on 34'.

The team entered the field with the following Line-Up:

Line-Up:

  Juan Olivares
  Elmo Aedo
  Luis Garisto
  Germán Concha
  Mnafredo González
  Armando Alarcón
  Luis Huanca
  Gustavo Cuello
  Juan Rogelio Núñez
  Héctor Castillo
  Guillermo González
  Coach: Andrés Prieto

The club was able to establish itself in Chile's top flight very quickly, earning promotion after its first season, where they have stayed ever since. Only four years after their foundation, Cobreloa reached the finals of the Copa Libertadores in 1981, losing in a third match to Brazilian club Flamengo. Cobreloa reached the Copa Libertadores final the following year, losing to Peñarol of Uruguay. The club also reached the semi-final of the Copa Libertadores in 1987.

They have competed in the Copa Libertadores de América 13 times, 3 times in the Copa Sudamericana and twice in the Copa CONMEBOL. In 1995 they reached the quarter-finals and the following year were eliminated in the first round. Cobreloa have 8 Primera División titles and 1 Copa Chile title making them the most successful side outside Santiago in Chile and one of the four biggest clubs of the country.

Domestic League record

Domestic League Chart with each tier division who the team has participated since 1977.

Notes

 In 1977, the team go to primera división de Chile.
 In 2015, the team was relegated to Primera B de Chile.

Support

In 2019 to get a membership of the club can be by the assistant to the headquarters of the club in Calama in Abaroa street N°1757 or through the online platform in the official website of the institution with previous registration. The necessary documents to get a membership are passport or ID Card and a photo.

The oldest oficial member of the club, is Rodolfo Yáñez Rojas, who is member since the foundation of the institution.

The first official supporters group was created in 1977, called Barra Oficial de Cobreloa by the workers from the El Loa province; Orlando Navarro, Mario Paniagua and José Santos Rodriguez and the support of the club directors.

In 1982, 35 CODELCO workers established the supporters group, Barra Chuquicamata. On this decade was created de group of supporters Mario Soto, tribute to Defense of the club, who dressed the club colors until 1985. They were characterized because they support with musical instruments.

In 1994 was created the supported group, Huracan Naranja, from the Santiago de Chile fans group Vicente Cantatore.

A poll called, Encuesta GFK Adimark, study who is the most popular team on Chile. Cobreloa in 2015 reached the most high value on the poll, with a 1,5% of the total of the population polled. And in the 2018 the lowest value with 0,9%.
In both polls the team was the 5th most popular club in country. In Región de Antofagasta the team reach since 2015 until 2019 the 12,752% of preference of the population.

The Cobreloa supporters, specifically the CODELCO Workers are known for been donates a day of salary to contribute to pay his signing pass of the defender, Mario Soto.

Colours, badge and symbols

The traditional color of Cobreloa is orange, according to president, José Gorrini, the color of the club was selected due to give tribute to Netherlands National Football Team, in the 70's this selection was very popular by players like Johan Cruyff. Also, by commercial reasons this color was selected due obtain travel discounts in the national airline, Ladeco (Línea aérea del Cobre), whose corporative color was orange.The idea for this was thanks to engineer of CODELCO Chuquicamata, Peter Kiefkoff, who accepted the task of managing the club's finances, on the condition that the club would wear the colors of his native country's team.

The first Cobreloa kit was red shirt and white shorts due lack of clothing, so its improvised in February 1977, valid for Copa Chile, facing up Regional Antofagasta. Since 1977 the classical kit of the team is full orange, with some modifications, like 1992–93 season with white shorts, in 2009–10 the official kit was change with white socks. The away kit has been mostly full white, until 2001–2006 year it changed by color black, also in 2013–15 and 2017–18 seasons alternating with white color during those years.

The first brand who was clothing the team was Chilean Sport brand 'Haddad', located in Santiago de Chile, due the international brands was not interested in clothing the team, aside the calama brands who was interested. However there was a moment who the team directors was decided to change the atire to the Chilean brand, 'Kotting'. Finally 'Haddad' was the first brand to dress to team, who was participated on Segunda División.

On 1978, the team participated on Primera División de Chile, hence the team change of sport brand, to the Mario Soto sports brand, called 'MyS'. Part of the player contract. On 1981, the team change the sport brand to the chilean brand 'New Lider' to participate in his first international competition, while 'MyS' continued give the training clothes until 1981.

On 1982, the club sings with the germany sport brand, Adidas, presented in the final of Copa Libertadores of this year, versus Peñarol of Uruguay.

The first commemorative shirt of the club was in 2007, with Spanish sportswear company, Kelme. That attire was a special logo on them. In December 2016, the sportswear company, Macron, announced for sale a commemorative shirt to celebrate 40 years of the club; the design was similar to the 1980s kits style.

On 4 February 2019, was shown its first third kit in Cobreloa, being the black the color that was elected due to the popular choice of the club fans.

The first badge was created by Enrique Escala, inspired by the symbol of copper, make reference to corporate logo of Codelco also, with a soccer ball insert instead the ball in the company logo. This badge has been changed multiple times, especially in the kits. The most notable change was change the name Cobreloa below the badge instead Calama word and adding the "Cobreloa" words in the upper side of the badge.

The first anthem of the club was written and composed by the musician and writer, Alejandro Álvarez Vargas—the winning contestant from a contest advertised through the local radio station

The first mascot of the club was a cartoon fox called Loíto; it was the original idea and creation of journalist, Alfredo Llewellyn Bustos. The design of the mascot was by the director René Vásquez Rodríguez. The mascot appears for the first time on a handbill of the club for membership recruitment and also in the local journal El Mercurio de Calama in 1977 with the purpose of following the activities of the team week-by-week.

Kit suppliers and shirt sponsors

Kit deals

Stadiums 

Since 1977 the first home ground of the club was the Estadio Municipal de Calama, who played the national league and internationals Cups matches until 27 January 2013. The last match that was played by the team in this stadium was against Colo-Colo, the team won 5–2.

For the two finals of Copa Libertadores the team played in the Estadio Nacional de Chile, in 1981 and 1982, against Clube de Regatas do Flamengo and Club Atletico Peñarol respectively.

In February 2013 due to the renovation of the Stadium, the team had to play in another's home ground, the first stadium at which it was elected to play was the Parque Estadio Juan López located in Antofagasta. For the first class matches the stadium elected was the Tierra de Campeones on Iquique, where Club de Deportes Universidad Católica plays.

The complaints of the team about the infrastructure of the stadium Juan López, the directing of the club made negotiations with the Municipality of Antofagasta to play in the Stadium Calvo y Bascuñan, in this homeground the team played the Copa Sudamericana matches, with Club Atletico Peñarol and Club Deportivo La Equidad and local first Class matches of the Local League for the rest of the year.

From June of this year, the main stadium at which the team played mostly the national league, in the recently inaugurated stadium Estadio Luis Becerra Constanzo, formerly called Estadio la Madriguera de Calama in Calama, the team inaugurated the home ground in a Copa Chile match against Club de Deportes Cobresal.

Since 2015, the team plays in the stadium Zorros del Desierto of Calama. The first match was against Club de Deportes Antofagasta. The team plays the local competitions like the Primera B de Chile and Copa Chile.

Honours

The team have won 8 domestic Leagues and the 1986 Copa Chile.

National honours
Primera División: 8
1980, 1982, 1985, 1988, 1992, 2003-A, 2003-C, 2004-C

Copa Chile: 1
1986

International honours
Copa Libertadores de América: 0
Runners-up (2): 1981, 1982

Records

Hector Puebla holds the most appearances with the club with 663 and holds the most appearances in domestics leagues with 457, on 16 years in the team (1980-1996), also, is the player with most titles with the club with 5 domestic leagues (1980, 1982, 1985, 1988, 1992) and the 1986 national Cup.

Juan Covarrubias is the all-time goalscorer for the team, with 147, and the top goalscorer in domestics leagues with 105 goals. He won with the team the domestics titles in 1988 and 1992.

The higher transfer fee on Chile was Eduardo Vargas transfer to the Universidad de Chile, for US$1.365 million.

This institution owns the fifth local unbeaten streak of the world, which extended from 22 December 1980 until 22 September 1985, with a total of 91 matches without loss in Calama for Domestic Matches.

Club records
Largest  victory: 10–0 (v. O'Higgins in the Copa Chile, 1979)
Largest Primera División victory: 9–0 (v. Regional Atacama in 1983)
Heaviest Primera División defeat: 1–6 (v. Huachipato in 1998)
Individual records
Most league goals in a single season: 42 (Patricio Galaz in 2004)
Most league goals in total: 104 (Juan Covarrubias)
Most goals in total: 144 (Juan Covarrubias)
Most Primera División appearances: 446 (Héctor Puebla from 1980 to 1996)
Most appearances in total: 662 (Héctor Puebla from 1980 to 1996)

Primera División top scorers

Copa Chile top scorers

Players

Current squad

2021 Winter transfers

In

Out

Retired numbers

 8 –  Fernando Cornejo, Midfielder (1992–1997, 2000–2004 )

Managerial and technical staff 

Source: tntsports.cl

Management 

The club is managed by Sociedad Anonima Deportiva Profesional (Professional Sports Corporation) format in Chile, through the Chilean law, N° 20.019 relativa a las Organizaciones Deportivas Profesionales (Related to Professional Sports Organizations). This law allow to organize, produce, marketing and participate in professional sports activities in the country.

On 2 October 2017, the club made an extraordinary assembly with the members of the club, the assistance of these with suffrage right was of 86. The purpose was to reform the statute regime of the club in that moment. This renewed statutes lay down the official address of the club, Calama, the indefinite length time of the directory and the unlimited number of member who could be owns.

This statute allude the principles and objectives of the institution, the rights and duties of the members, the heritage and the administration,  the members general assemblies, the directory, the duties of the directors of the corporation, subsidiaries of the club and the rules of this.

Board of directors 

Source: www.tntsports.cl

Organizational Chart

 

 

 

Administration

Managers
Cobreloa managers from 1977 to present:

Andrés Prieto (1977–79)
Vicente Cantatore (1980–84)
Jorge Toro (1985–86)
Jorge Luis Siviero (1986–88)
Miguel Hermosilla (1988–89)
Gustavo Cuello (1989)
Andrés Prieto (1989–90)
Fernando Cavalleri (1991–92)
Mario Osbén (1992)
José Sulantay (1992–93)
Jorge Garcés (1994–95)
Miguel Hermosilla (1995–97)
Carlos Rojas (1997–98)
Mario Herrera (1998)
Arturo Salah (1999−00)
Carlos Rojas (2000)
Oscar Malbernat (2000–01)
Víctor Merello (15 Jan 2001 – 31 Dec 2002)
Nelson Acosta (1 Jan 2002–03)
Gilberto Reyes (2003)
Eduardo Fournier (2003)
Luis Garisto (2003)
Fernando Díaz (2004)
Miguel Hermosilla (2004)
Nelson Acosta (2004–05)
Jorge Socías (2005)
Eduardo Fournier (2005)
Miguel Hermosilla (2005)
Jorge Aravena (2006)
Gustavo Huerta (2007)
Gustavo Benítez (2008)
Rubén Vallejos (2008)
Marco Antonio Figueroa (2008)
Marcelo Trobbiani (2009)
Rubén Vallejos (2009)
Germán Cornejo (2009)
Raúl Toro (29 Aug 2009 – 30 March 2010)
Germán Cornejo (2010)
Mario Soto (2010)
Nelson Acosta (1 Jan 2011 – 2 April 2012)
Roberto Espicto (2012)
Javier Torrente (19 April 2012 – 6 Dec 2012)
Marco Antonio Figueroa (6 Dec 2012 – 15 July 2013)
Jorge García (25 June 2013 – 18 Feb 2014)
Marcelo Trobbiani (2014)
Marco Antonio Figueroa (2015)
César Vigevani (2015–16)
César Bravo (2016)
Carlos Rojas (2016)
César Bravo (2016)
Rodrigo Meléndez (interim) (2016–present)

Presidents
Cobreloa presidents from 1977 to present:

 1977: Francisco Núñez Venegas
 1978: Esteban Ibáñez
 1978: José Gorrini Sanguinetti
 1978–82: Sergio Stoppel García
 1983–87: Luis Gómez Araya
 1987–88: Sergio Stoppel García
 1989–91: Pedro Cortés Navia
 1991–92: Luis Urrutia Concha
 1992–93: Orlando Álvarez Campos
 1993–98: Sergio Jarpa Gibert
 1998–99: Pedro Pablo Latorre Muñoz
 1999–03: Heriberto Pinto García
 2003–06: Gerardo Mella Fernández
 2006–07: Augusto González Aguirre
 2007–10: Juan George George
 2010–12: Javier Maureira Alfaro
 2012–14: Mario Herrera Pinto
 2014: Jorge Pereira
 2014–15: Augusto González Aguirre
 2015–present: Gerardo Mella Fernandez

References

Sources

Books
 Libro Oficial Cobreloa Un Impacto en el Desierto (2007), Carlos Gómez/Cedep, Chile

Magazines

External links

   
 Huracan Naranja  
 Mundo Loíno 

 
Football clubs in Chile
Association football clubs established in 1977
1977 establishments in Chile